Rock Canyon High School is a public high school in Highlands Ranch, Colorado.  It is part of Douglas County School District RE-1.

Notable alumni
Ingrid Andress, country music singer-songwriter.
 Jacob Lissek (born 1992), soccer player. In 2008, he and the school's soccer team won the Colorado 4a state championship. That season he was named second team all-league.

References

External links
Rock Canyon High School

Educational institutions established in 2003
Public high schools in Colorado
Schools in Douglas County, Colorado
2003 establishments in Colorado